Asobo Studio SAS is a French video game developer based in Bordeaux and founded in 2002. The studio is most known for developing video game adaptations of several Pixar movies, A Plague Tale: Innocence, and the 2020 version of Microsoft Flight Simulator. The studio's name is derived from the Japanese word "asobou" (遊ぼう) that means "let's play".

History
In 2002, a group of twelve video game developers purchased the rights to the multiplayer PlayStation 2 video game Super Farm and founded Asobo Studio. Their first game was published in 2003 by Ignition Entertainment. During the following years, the studio developed several games for various platforms, until being chosen by publisher THQ to create the video game adaptation of Pixar film Ratatouille. Asobo started increasing its growth-speed, recruiting about 20% new employees a year, leading to two separate production lines. Asobo was selected to develop the video game adaptation of Pixar's following films WALL-E and Up.

During the 2008 Games Convention, the video game publisher Codemasters announced Fuel, a racing game developed by Asobo Studio. Fuel was released in 2009 for the Xbox 360, PlayStation 3 and PC. The studio worked on Kinect Rush: A Disney-Pixar Adventure for Xbox 360 Kinect between 2010 and 2012. The game features a scanning process, enabling the player to create their own Pixar avatar, looking like them. It features characters from Ratatouille, The Incredibles, Cars, Up and Toy Story. The game was published by Microsoft and Disney Interactive Studios in March 2012.

In 2014, Asobo Studio partnered with Ubisoft to release Monopoly Family Fun pack on PlayStation 3, PlayStation 4, Xbox 360 and Xbox One, including Monopoly Plus, My Monopoly and Monopoly Deal, as well as The Crew for Xbox 360. In 2016, Asobo Studio partnered with Microsoft again to release two games on HoloLens: Fragments and Young Conker. Both games are available in the Development Edition, released on March 30, 2016. Asobo Studio was the first independent developer in Holographic Entertainment and won the 2016 French Video Game Creator Prize awarded by Syntec Numérique EY and SNJV. In 2017, the studio announced A Plague Tale: Innocence, an adventure game, released for PC and consoles in 2019 and published by Focus Home Interactive. They also worked with Engine Software to develop Monopoly for Nintendo Switch, which came out later that year. On August 18, 2020, their next game, Microsoft Flight Simulator, was released for Microsoft Windows.

In 2021, Sagard NewGen purchased a stake of just over 30% for €20 million, valuing the company at approximately €65 million.

In March 2021, Asobo's Microsoft Flight Simulator won the Pégase for Best French video game of the year. This is the second consecutive year that the studio has been awarded after A Plague Taleː Innocence in 2020. The sequel of A Plague Tale: Innocence, titled A Plague Tale: Requiem, was released on October 18, 2022.

Games developed

References

External links
 

French companies established in 2002
Companies based in Bordeaux
Video game companies established in 2002
Video game companies of France
Video game development companies
Privately held companies of France